Brian Windhorst (born January 29, 1978) is an American sportswriter for ESPN.com who covers the National Basketball Association (NBA). He was the Cleveland Cavaliers beat writer for the Akron Beacon Journal from 2003 through the summer of 2008, and began to work for Cleveland newspaper The Plain Dealer in October 2008. He moved to ESPN in 2010 after LeBron James left the Cleveland Cavaliers for the Miami Heat.

Early life and education 
Windhorst attended high school in Akron, Ohio at St. Vincent–St. Mary High School, the same school that Lebron James would later attend, and graduated from Kent State University with a Bachelor of Arts in journalism in 2000.

Career 
Windhorst began covering James during his high school playing career, and began covering the Cavaliers in 2003, the year that James was drafted. While James was the youngest player in the NBA, Windhorst was the youngest traveling NBA beat writer. In 2007, he co-wrote The Franchise: LeBron James and the Remaking of the Cleveland Cavaliers with sports columnist Terry Pluto. His writing at The Plain Dealer was honored by the United States Basketball Writers Association for Best Game Story in 2009, and by the Associated Press.

In 2010, Windhorst left the Plain Dealer for ESPN to cover James' new team, the Miami Heat. Prior to leaving The Plain Dealer, he contributed columns to ESPN.com and made appearances on ESPN First Take. In an interview, Windhorst stated that "obviously LeBron's a huge factor" in his decision to join ESPN, but that the Cavaliers "need to move on" without James.

On October 10, 2014, it was announced that Windhorst would join ESPN Cleveland on WKNR AM 850 in Cleveland to be their Cavaliers beat reporter and analyst, as well as host his own weekly program on sister station WWGK AM 1540. The move followed James' re-signing with the Cavaliers in 2014.

In addition to writing for ESPN, Windhorst hosts the popular Hoop Collective podcast. He lives in Omaha, Nebraska.

On February 10, 2022, Windhorst received significant acclaim for besting one of the premier NBA reporters, Adrian Wojnarowski, on James Harden's 2022 trade from the Brooklyn Nets to the Philadelphia 76ers. Wojnarowski had publicly refuted Windhorst's reporting on trade talks occurring between the two teams. Despite his ESPN colleague's claims, Windhorst adamantly reported serious trade talks were occurring. Windhorst was proven correct the following day when Harden was traded for Ben Simmons in a blockbuster trade.

Publications
Pluto, Terry and Windhorst, Brian (2007). The Franchise: LeBron James and the Remaking of the Cleveland Cavaliers. Cleveland, OH: Gray & Company, Publishers. 
Pluto, Terry and Windhorst, Brian (2009). LeBron James: The Making of an MVP. Cleveland, OH: Gray & Company, Publishers. 
McMenamin, David and Windhorst, Brian (2017). Return of the King: LeBron James, the Cleveland Cavaliers, and the Greatest Comeback in NBA History. New York City, NY: Grand Central Publishing. 
Windhorst, Brian (2019). LeBron, Inc.: The Making of a Billion-Dollar Athlete. New York City, NY: Grand Central Publishing

References

External links

Brian Windhorst ESPN story archive
"Stories of LeBron and sportswriter intertwined, tangled", St. Petersburg Times, 21 November 2010 - profile of Windhorst by Michael Kruse
A sample chapter from the book LeBron James: The Making of an MVP by Terry Pluto and Brian Windhorst
A sample chapter from the book The Franchise by Terry Pluto and Brian Windhorst

1978 births
Living people
American sportswriters
Journalists from Ohio
Kent State University alumni
Radio personalities from Ohio
Writers from Akron, Ohio
St. Vincent–St. Mary High School alumni